Albania–India relations are the international relations that exist between Albania and India.

India maintains an honorary consul in Tirana. The Embassy of India in Bucharest, Romania is concurrently accredited to Albania and Moldova. Albania maintains two honorary consuls in Mumbai and Delhi.

History
Diplomatic relations between Albania and India were established in 1956. India has had an honorary consul in Tirana since 2004. Albania opened an embassy in New Delhi in early 2008 and the first Albanian  Ambassador to India presented his credentials to the President in October 2010. However, the embassy was closed due to budget cuts by the Albanian government. Albania currently has two honorary consuls in Mumbai and Delhi.

The first foreign office consultations between the two countries was held in February 2003 in Tirana. Albanian President Rexhep Meidani visited Kolkata in 1997 to attend the funeral of Mother Teresa. Lulzim  Basha became the first Albanian  Foreign  Minister  to visit India in December 2008.

On 27 November 2015 India and Albania abolished visas for diplomatic and service passports.

Economic relations
Bilateral trade between Albania and India was negligible until the early 1990s. Bilateral trade between the two countries measured US$ 68.20 million in 2017-18, and declined to 59.70 million in 2018-19. The main commodities exported by India to Albania are ceramic products, articles of stone, plaster, cement, aluminum and aluminum products, coffee, tea, mate and spices, electrical machinery and equipment, organic chemicals, raw hides and skins, nuclear reactors, boilers, machinery and mechanical appliances, fish and crustaceans, mollusks, and plastics. The major commodities imported by India from Albania are iron and steel, salt, sulfur earths and stone, raw hides and skins (other than fur skins), leather, aluminum and aluminum articles, oil seeds and olea, footwear, electrical machinery and equipment, essential oils and resinoids, and plastics.

In Feb 2012, a  venture of India Albania Trade Expo was held to experience the potential of outsourced jobs in India where the cost effectiveness of the Indian businesses was on focus and also to exploit the potential deals and ventures from the Albanian side. The Expo was treated as an international platform to about 300 Indian companies to explore the untapped markets of Albania to achieve the bilateral profits.

Albania and India signed a Double Taxation Avoidance Agreement in July 2013. In January 2015, India and Albania agreed to boost cooperation with Indian investment in the oil and gas sector. A Memorandum of Collaboration (MoC) has also been signed in New Delhi where human resource development minister and petroleum and natural gas minister were present.

In November 2018, the Government of Albania awarded a contract to a consortium led by India Power Corporation Ltd. to build the country's first solar power station.

Cultural relations
Mother Teresa, who became an Indian citizen in 1951, was of Albanian origin. The Tirana airport is named in her honour.

Indian films are broadcast on Albanian television and a few Indian films have been shot in Albania. An Indian Council for Cultural Relations (ICCR) sponsored Manipuri dance troupe  visited  Albania in November 2012 and performed during the centenary celebrations of Albania's independence. An ICCR sponsored Mohiniyattam dance troupe led by Dr. Neena Prasad, and accompanied by musicians, visited Tirana and performed on 6 June 2019. The International Day of Yoga has been celebrated in Tirana annually since 2015. The 5th International Day of Yoga was celebrated at Selman Stermasi Stadium in Tirana on 17 June 2019.

Less than 100 Indians live in Albania as of February 2020. Most of them are employed as professionals in management positions in foreign-owned companies

References

External links
 Embassy of India, Bucharest

 
India 
Bilateral relations of India